Khamir County is in Hormozgan province, Iran. The capital of the county is the city of Bandar Khamir. At the 2006 census, the county's population was 47,545 in 10,320 households. The following census in 2011 counted 52,968 people in 13,245 households. At the 2016 census, the county's population was 56,148 in 16,071 households.

Administrative divisions

The population history and structural changes of Khamir County's administrative divisions over three consecutive censuses are shown in the following table. The latest census shows two districts, four rural districts, and two cities.

References

 

Counties of Hormozgan Province